Frøydis Elisabeth Sund (born 18 May 1980) is a Norwegian politician for the Socialist Left Party.

She served as a deputy representative to the Parliament of Norway from Hedmark during the terms 2001–2005, 2005–2009 and 2009–2013.

She has been a member of Hamar city council.

References

1980 births
Living people
Politicians from Hamar
Deputy members of the Storting
Socialist Left Party (Norway) politicians
Hedmark politicians
Women members of the Storting
21st-century Norwegian politicians